Peterhouse may refer to:

 Peterhouse, Cambridge
 Peterhouse Boys' School
 Peterhouse Girls' School
 Peterhouse school of history
 Peterhouse partbooks
 Peterhouse Group of Schools